Renata Kałuża (born 28 April 1981) is a Polish para-cyclist and former mountaineer who represented Poland in the 2020 Summer Paralympics.

Career
On 13 March 2007 Kałuża had an accident while climbing in Przełom Białki near Krempachy, which left her permanently paralyzed from the chest down. Since then, she has been using a wheelchair and turned to para-cycling.

Kałuża represented Poland in the women's road time trial H1–3 event at the 2020 Summer Paralympics and won a bronze medal.

References

1981 births
Living people
Polish female cyclists
Cyclists at the 2016 Summer Paralympics
Cyclists at the 2020 Summer Paralympics
Medalists at the 2020 Summer Paralympics
Paralympic medalists in cycling
Paralympic bronze medalists for Poland
People from Nowy Targ County
21st-century Polish women